The Tenth Five-Year Plan, or the 10th Five-Year Plan of the Union of Soviet Socialist Republics (USSR), was a set of goals designed to strengthen the country's economy between 1976 and 1980. The plan was presented by the Chairman of the Council of Ministers Alexei Kosygin at the 25th Congress of the Communist Party of the Soviet Union (CPSU). Officially the plan was normally referred to as "The Plan of Quality and Efficiency".

The 25th Congress and development

Alexei Kosygin, Chairman of the Council of Ministers presented the plan at the 25th Congress of the Communist Party of the Soviet Union (CPSU) in 1976. General Secretary Leonid Brezhnev told the Central Committee (CC) in an annual address in October 1976 that "Efficiency and quality" was to become the plan's official motto. Brezhnev claimed that the Soviet economy faced declining growth due to slow technological progress at home hence the plan emphasised the need to buy foreign technology. Soviet agriculture was given top priority in the plan, with Brezhnev stating that investment in agriculture (at 27 percent during the Tenth Five-Year Plan) must stay close to at least the same level during the Eleventh Five-Year Plan as it did during the tenth. Investment in chemical and petrochemical industry doubled in the Tenth Five-Year plan in comparison with its predecessor.

It was reported that the Political Bureau (Politburo) rejected the draft of the Tenth Five-Year Plan twice because it demanded too little growth in the consumer goods sector of the economy.

Brezhnev had proposed in March 1974 that the two major projects in the plan would be (1) construction of the Baikal Amur Mainline railway in Siberia, and (2) rural development of the backward non-chernozem zone of European Russia.

Fulfillment 
During the term of the plan, renovation of enterprises in the oil refining industry made up two thirds of national capital investment.
Due to the Soviet government's emphasis on technological innovation, 10–12 percent of the total investment in machinery and equipment was spent on foreign imported technology. Licensed purchases from the West increased dramatically, with the number of import of licenses issued quadrupling during the Tenth Five-Year Plan compared to the previous five-year plan. According to a report entitled Oil Supplementary  by the Central Intelligence Agency (CIA), the USSR would not fulfill its annual output target of 640 million tons of oil. Planned increases in labour productivity also failed to materialise.

Contemporary Soviet statistics show that plan fulfillment was higher in the European part of the USSR and the Caucasus than in Central Asia. In fact, all Central Asian republics fell short of plan targets. For example, in the Turkmen Soviet Socialist Republic's (TSSR) the planned industrial growth was 30 percent, while it grew only by 12 percent in the five-year period. As seen in the adjacent table, only the Armenian SSR and the Azerbaijan SSR out of the fifteen republics fulfilled planned industrial output, while only two republics increased theirs (the Armenian SSR and the Georgian SSR). Semion Grossu, the First Secretary of the Communist Party of Moldova, blamed "fundamental flaws in economic activity" which made it close to impossible to fulfill the plan's criteria. The Baikal Amur Mainline railway in Siberia was officially finished in 1984, but was not fully completed until 1991.

The 1979 Soviet economic reform, or "Improving planning and reinforcing the effects of the economic mechanism on raising the effectiveness in production and improving the quality of work", was an economic reform initiated by Alexei Kosygin. In contrast with many of his earlier reform initiatives, such as the 1965 economic reform, which successfully centralised the economy by enhancing the powers of the ministries, this reform failed to fulfill the rest of the Tenth Five-Year Plan.

See also
 Five-year plans of the Soviet Union
 First Five-Year Plan (Soviet Union)
 Ninth Five-Year Plan (Soviet Union)
 Eleventh Five-Year Plan (Soviet Union)

References
Notes

1976 in the Soviet Union
1977 in the Soviet Union
1978 in the Soviet Union
1979 in the Soviet Union
1980 in the Soviet Union
1970s economic history
1980s economic history
10
1970s in the Soviet Union
1976 in economics
Era of Stagnation